Pough is a surname. Notable people with the surname include:

Ernie Pough (born 1952), American football player
James Edward Pough (1948–1990), American mass murderer
Oliver Pough, American football player and coach
Richard Pough (1904–2003), American conservationist